Palasport di Genova is an indoor arena in Genoa, Italy. The arena holds 15,000 spectators. It is primarily used for indoor athletics, motocross events and concerts. It is located within the area that hosts the Genoa Fair, of which it represents the S Pavilion.

Events
From 1970 to 2008, it hosted twenty-two editions of the Italian Indoor Athletics Championships and in 1983 it hosted the only indoor edition of the Italian Super Bowl. It was one of the venues for the European Indoor Athletics Championships in 1992.

The Euroflora exhibition was held here from the first edition in 1966 until 2011 (every 5 years for a total of ten editions).

Concerts
The arena has a spectator capacity of 15,000 spectators during concerts. The Beatles performed here on June 26, 1965 and Kiss on August 31, 1980. Other performers include Peter Gabriel, Iron Maiden, Jethro Tull, Frank Zappa, America, Santana, Eric Clapton, Joni Mitchell, Spandau Ballet, Frank Sinatra.

See also
List of indoor arenas in Italy

References

External links

Venue homepage

Indoor arenas in Italy
Indoor track and field venues
Sports venues completed in 1962